Brosnahan Island is an island  long, rising above the western part of the Ross Ice Shelf  northeast of Cape Murray. It was mapped by the United States Geological Survey from tellurometer surveys and Navy air photos, 1959–63, and named by the Advisory Committee on Antarctic Names for Commander James J. Brosnahan, U.S. Navy, commander of the McMurdo Station winter party, 1961.

See also 
 List of antarctic and sub-antarctic islands

References 

Islands of the Ross Dependency
Hillary Coast